Playing the Building was an art installation by David Byrne, ex singer of Talking Heads, and Färgfabriken, an independent art venue in Stockholm. It originally ran from October 8 to November 13, 2005, at Färgfabriken. The concept would later be realized in New York City in the Battery Maritime Building in 2008 (May 31 to August 10), in London in The Roundhouse in 2009 (August 8 to 31), and in Minneapolis at the Aria building in the Minneapolis Warehouse Historic District in 2012 (November 5 to December 4).

The concept entailed utilizing the infrastructure of these buildings and spaces as resonating bodies to create sounds. Different methods are used to produce the sounds, including hitting columns with metal rods, strapping vibrating motors to girders, and blowing air through pipes. The sounds often resemble musical instruments, including organs and flutes.

References

External links
"Playing the Building" DavidByrne.com
"Playing the Building" ARIA
"David Byrne Attends the Opening of Playing the Building" City Pages
"David Byrne's Playing the Building Art Installation" Mpls St Paul Magazine
"Playing the Building by David Byrne" MPR News
Video tour: David Byrne: Playing the Building (BBtv)

Installation art works
Sound sculptures
2005 sculptures
David Byrne
Sculptures in the United States
Sculptures in London